A Personal Retirement Savings Account (PRSA) is a type of savings account introduced to the Irish market in 2003. In an attempt to increase pension coverage, the Pensions Board introduced a retirement savings account, that would entice the lower paid and self-employed to start making some pension provision. The intention was for PRSAs to supplement any State Retirement Benefits that would be payable in years to come.

The product
There are two types of PRSAs, Standard and Non-Standard. 

The Standard PRSA has a legal cap on charges. The maximum annual management charge is 1% and the maximum charge on each contribution is 5%. There can be no other charge applied to the setting up of a PRSA, unless it forms part of an overall financial review. In this case, a fee may be charged for the advice given.

The Non-Standard PRSA can have charges higher than those stated for a Standard PRSA.

A consumer can purchase a PRSA with or without advice. If the consumer does not need advice on the product or in selecting investment funds, they can buy a PRSA on an 'Execution Only' basis. The reward for the consumer in electing for this method of purchase is that they can buy the product without the 5% contribution charge.

The PRSA product can also be used to supplement existing pension funding by making additional voluntary contributions to any other pension scheme available through an employer.

Payment

The minimum contribution to a PRSA is €10 per month. This can be paid by salary deduction or through the contributors own bank account. If the contribution is deducted from salary, then any Tax and PRSI (Pay Related Social Insurance) Reliefs are applied at source so that the payments are made on a nett basis.

If payments are made from the contributors bank account, then any Tax or PRSI Reliefs that may be due would have to be applied for 'manually' through Revenue. Tax Relief and PRSI Relief are dealt with by two separate section of Revenue.

Employers' obligations

Employers have to offer their employees the facility to put in place at least one Standard PRSA in situations where:

 there is no pension scheme currently in place 
 some employees are excluded from the existing pension scheme 
 the waiting period for membership of the existing scheme is more than 6 months 
 The current pension scheme rules do not allow employees to make AVCs

Employers are not obliged to make contributions to an employee's PRSA.

Funds

The PRSA contributor can select a single fund or combination of funds from those provided by each of the PRSA providers. They can also elect to choose a 'Default Investment Strategy' which is designed to fulfil the reasonable expectations of a typical investor.

Death before normal retirement
In the event of death before normal retirement, the full value of the PRSA fund, without liability to income tax, is paid to the PRSA holders estate. Inheritance Tax may apply to the fund. The PRSA fund assets can be used to provide a pension for a spouse.

Tax

There are certain Revenue limits that apply to the maximum contribution that can be made in any one tax year. These are dependent on the age of the contributor and their earnings (defined as net relevant earnings) as set out in the table below.

The maximum annual income limit for calculating tax relief is €115,000 however any excess above the limit may be available for relief in future years subject to the relevant limits not being surpassed.

The Tax Relief available on contributions are granted at the contributors highest marginal rate of tax. For example, if an employees highest rate of income tax is 41% and they also pay PRSI of 6%, the nett cost on a contribution of €100 would be €53.

Any investment growth accumulates free of tax which is referred to as "gross roll-up".

Contributors are entitled to 25% of their accumulated fund at retirement, tax-free. The balance of the fund is subject to the income tax rates prevalent at the date of retirement.

At retirement

Most PRSA contributors elect to take 25% of their fund tax-free. If they do this they can either buy an annuity with the balance, invest in an ARF (Approved Retirement Fund) or a combination of both.  Contributions can be made to a PRSA up to age 75, but must then be transferred to an annuity or ARF.

Similar policies in other countries
 Registered retirement savings plan (RRSP) and tax-free savings account (TFSA) (Canada)
 Superannuation in Australia (Australia) – Australia and New Zealand have a reciprocal agreement allowing Australians moving to New Zealand to transfer their Australian superannuation scheme to an approved KiwiSaver funds, and vice versa.
 KiwiSaver (New Zealand) – Australia and New Zealand have a reciprocal agreement allowing New Zealanders moving to Australia to transfer their KiwiSaver funds to an approved Australian superannuation scheme, and vice versa.
 Mandatory Provident Fund (Hong Kong)
 Vanuatu National Provident Fund (Vanuatu) - a compulsory savings scheme for employees who receive a salary of Vt3,000 or more a month, to help them financially at retirement.
 Central Provident Fund (Singapore)
 Employees Provident Fund (Malaysia)
 Individual Savings Account (ISA) (United Kingdom)
 Nippon individual savings account (NISA) (Japan)

See also
Pensions in the Republic of Ireland

References

External links
Irish Revenue
List of approved PRSA providers

Economy of the Republic of Ireland